Manoa Thompson (born 11 June 1968) is a Fijian former professional rugby league footballer. He represented the Fijian national team.

Thompson is the father of former professional NRL, NFL, and rugby sevens player, Jarryd Hayne.

Early years
Thompson was born in Fiji to a Fijian mother, Elenoa Tokalautawa, and an Australian father, and moved to Australia when he was 11. He was adopted by his mother's younger sister, Ana Waqanibaravi Thompson. He played his junior football with the Alexandria Rovers. Thompson also played rugby union and toured Japan with a New South Wales schoolboys side that included Graham Mackay and Scott Gourley.

Playing career
Thompson joined the South Sydney Rabbitohs, where he played in their champion under-21 side before playing in their under-23 side. He made his first grade début for Souths in round 11 of the 1989 season.

Thompson went on to play 61 first grade games for Souths between 1989 and 1993. He spent 1994 with the Western Suburbs Magpies, playing in only seven matches after having knee and ankle surgery during the off season. In 1995 he was part of the inaugural squad for the new Auckland Warriors franchise and played in the centres for the Warriors in their first ever competition game, a 25-22 loss to the Brisbane Broncos in front of 29,220 fans at the Ericsson Stadium in Auckland. However, he again only played in seven matches and was not retained for the 1996 season.

In November 1995 Thompson signed with English club Warrington and played for the club during 1996's inaugural Super League I. He left Warrington in February 1996 after failing to settle in Britain. Thompson represented Fiji in 1996. His only appearance saw a 72-4 loss to Great Britain at the Prince Charles Park in Nadi, the score being the record for the largest test win by the Lions.

After returning from England, Thompson trialed with the Canberra Raiders before signing with the Penrith Panthers. However he spent the season in reserve grade and returned to South Sydney during the off season.

After not securing a contract, Thompson moved to France and played for AS Saint Estève before spending a year in rugby union, playing for RC Narbonne alongside David Knox. Thompson then returned to league, spending a season with AS Carcassonne before retiring.

Later years
In 2007 he was working as a delivery driver. He is still involved in rugby league, sitting on the Australian Fiji rugby league board and helping to coach that organisation's youth sides.

References

External links 

South Sydney Profile

1968 births
Living people
AS Carcassonne players
AS Saint Estève players
Fijian emigrants to Australia
Fijian people of Australian descent
Fijian rugby league players
Australian people of I-Taukei Fijian descent
Fiji national rugby league team players
New Zealand Warriors players
Rugby league centres
South Sydney Rabbitohs players
Warrington Wolves players
Western Suburbs Magpies players